"Stem" is a song by DJ Shadow from his 1996 debut studio album, Endtroducing...... The song reached number 9 on the Irish Singles Chart, DJ Shadow's only top 10 hit to date.

The album version of the song combines "Stem" with "Long Stem".

Samples used
Like all other tracks on the album, "Stem"/"Long Stem" makes heavy use of sampling. Below are among the samples used for the track:

The first sample used in the track is sampled from the beginning of the 1969 song "Love Suite" by English rock band Nirvana.
The "...uicide...uicide..." vocal sample is taken from "Moshitup" by American hip-hop artist Just-Ice featuring fellow American hip-hop artist KRS-One. 
The high-pitched string samples are sampled from "Variazione III" by Italian progressive rock band Osanna.
The recurring guitar and violin parts are sampled from "Linde Manor" by American singer-songwriter Dennis Linde.
The organ sample that starts "Long Stem" is taken from "Tears" by Italian musician Giorgio Moroder; the same sample is used on another track on Endtroducing...., "Organ Donor".
The "I could just lay right down..." vocal sample is taken from "Blues So Bad" by American funk/soul group The Mystic Number National Bank.
The "parking tickets" monologue which appears midway in the song is sampled from "Freedom" by American comedian Murray Roman.
The synths that appear in the "Long Stem" section of the song are sampled from "Oleo Strut" by American electronic group Mother Mallard's Portable Masterpiece Company.

CD Track listing
"Stem" – 3:24
"Long Stem" – 4:26
"Red Bus Needs to Leave!" – 2:41
"Soup" – 0:43

7" Track listing 
 "Stem (Cops 'N' Robbers) - 3:38
 "Red Bus Needs to Leave!" - 2:41
The version of 'Stem' on the 7" version contains dialogue samples from the Michael Mann film 'Heat' (1995).

In popular culture
It has been featured in several films and on television, including:

 The 1997 film, Twin Town.
 The 1997 film, One Eight Seven.
 The 1999 film, Wisconsin Death Trip, originally broadcast in the UK as part of the BBC's Arena series.
 In Chris Morris' TV series, Jam, and in its radio predecessor, Blue Jam which aired on Channel 4 in 2000 and BBC Radio 1 from 1997-99 respectively.
 An advert for a BBC television programme that aired in November 2006 called, Lock Them Up or Let Them Out.
 Used in the background of the ITV programme, The X Factor in series 3.
A BBC World War II documentary about Saint-Nazaire that aired on 18 March 2007 called, Jeremy Clarkson: Greatest Raid of All Time. The show was repeated on the BBC on 29 June 2008.
 UK TV adverts for O2 and Guinness.
The 2007 UK Bravo TV series, Brits Behind Bars: America's Toughest Jail.
A BBC Panorama programme in June 2007.
Football's Hardest Away Days on Bravo.
An episode of the BBC One TV series, Britain's Lost World that aired on June 26, 2008.
The trailer for 2003 film, Gothika.
First semi-final of season 1 of British TV series, Britain's Got Talent, during the flashback introduction for MD Productions.
A 2009 French anti-drugs campaign.
As background music in many shows of the BBC program, Horizon.
As background music for Ex Machina trailer.

1996 singles
DJ Shadow songs
American hip hop songs
1996 songs
Songs written by DJ Shadow